Brańszczyk  is a village in Wyszków County, Masovian Voivodeship, in east-central Poland. It is the seat of the gmina (administrative district) called Gmina Brańszczyk.

The village has a population of 1,000.

References

External links
 Jewish Community in Brańszczyk on Virtual Shtetl

Villages in Wyszków County